Emerald Lake is a lake located in the Trinity Alps Wilderness area, in Northern California. It is dammed with a rock wall constructed many years ago when the area was used by miners. Visitors can still find old rusty pieces of their equipment around the lake, including giant gears, winches, and cables.

Visitors can access the lake by hiking the Stuart Fork Trail, and the lake is downstream of Sapphire Lake.

See also
List of lakes in California

References

Klamath Mountains
Lakes of Trinity County, California
Lakes of California
Lakes of Northern California